Koradacheri block is a revenue block in the Needamangalam taluk of Tiruvarur district, Tamil Nadu, India. It has a total of 44 panchayat villages.

Panchayat Villages 

1 Abivirutheeswaram 

2 AGARATHIRUNALLUR

3 AMMAIYAPPAN

4 ARASAVANANKADU

5 ATHICHOZHAMANGALAM

6 ATHIKADAI

7 AYIKUDI

8 DEVERKANDANALLUR

9 ELAVANGARKUDI

10 ELAIYUR

11 ENGAN

12 ERUKATTUR 

13 KAMALAPURAM 

14 KAMUGAKUDI 

15 KARAIYAPALAYUR

16 KALATHUR 

17 KATTUR

18 KAVANUR

19 KAPPANAMANGALAM

20 KANKODUTHAVANITHAM

21 KEERANGUDI

22 MANAKKAL

23 MELARATHANALLUR

24 MELATHIRUMATHIKUNNAM

25 MUSIRIYAM 

26 NAGAKUDI 

27 NEIKUPPAI

28 PATHUR 

29 PARUTHIYUR 

30 PERUNTHARAKUDI

31 PERUMPUGALUR

32 PERUMALAGARAM

33 SEMMANGUDI

34 SELLUR

35 THIYAGARAJAPURAM 

36 THIRUKANNAMANGAI 

37 THIRUKKALAMBUR 

38 THIRUVIDAVASAL 

39 UTHIRANGUDI

40 URKUDI

41 VADAGANDAM 

42 VANDAMPALAI

43 VIDAYAPURAM

44 VISWANATHAPURAM

References 

 

Revenue blocks of Tiruvarur district